Percy Smith (28 March 1883 – 23 June 1932) was a New Zealand cricketer. He played in one first-class match for Wellington in 1909/10.

See also
 List of Wellington representative cricketers

References

External links
 

1883 births
1932 deaths
New Zealand cricketers
Wellington cricketers
Cricketers from Wellington City